A loincloth is a one-piece garment, either wrapped around itself or kept in place by a belt. It covers the genitals and sometimes the buttocks. Loincloths which are held up by belts or strings are specifically known as breechcloth or breechclout. Often, the flaps hang down in front and back.

History and types 

Loincloths are worn in societies where no other clothing is needed or wanted. Loincloths are commonly used as an undergarment or swimsuit by wrestlers and by farmers in paddy fields in both Sri Lanka and India, where it is called Kovanam in Tamil,  in Sinhala and kaupinam  or langot.

The loincloth, or breechcloth, is a basic form of dress, often worn as the only garment. Men have worn a loincloth as a fundamental piece of clothing which covers their genitals, not the buttocks, in most societies which disapproved of genital nakedness throughout human history. The loincloth is in essence a piece of material, bark-bast, leather, or cloth, passed between the legs and covering the genitals. Despite its functional simplicity, the loincloth comes in many different forms.

The styles in which breechcloths and loincloths can be arranged are myriad. Both the Bornean sirat and the Indian dhoti have fabric pass between the legs to support a man's genitals.

A similar style of loincloth was also characteristic of ancient Mesoamerica. The male inhabitants of the area of modern Mexico wore a wound loincloth of woven fabric. One end of the loincloth was held up, the remainder passed between the thighs, wound about the waist, and secured in back by tucking.

In Pre-Columbian South America, ancient Inca men wore a strip of cloth between their legs held up by strings or tape as a belt. The cloth was secured to the tapes at the back and the front portion hung in front as an apron, always well ornamented.

Some of the culturally diverse Amazonian indigenous still wear an ancestral type of loincloth.

The  is a  piece of fabric (cotton or silk) passed between the thighs and secured to cover the genitals.

Loincloths by culture

India 
Unsewn Kaupinam and its later-era sewn variation langot are traditional clothes in India, worn as underwear in dangal held in akharas especially wrestling, to prevent hernias and hydrocele. Kacchera is mandatory for Sikhs to wear.

Japan 

Japanese men and women traditionally wore a loincloth known as a fundoshi. The fundoshi is a 35 cm (14 in.) wide piece of fabric (cotton or silk) passed between the thighs and secured to cover the genitals. There are many ways of tying the fundoshi.

Native American 

In most Native American tribes, men used to wear some form of breechcloth, often with leggings. The style differed from tribe to tribe. In many tribes, the flaps hung down in front and back; in others, the breechcloth looped outside the belt and was tucked into the inside, for a more fitted look. Sometimes, the breechcloth was much shorter and a decorated apron panel was attached in front and behind.

A Native American woman or teenage girl might also wear a fitted breechcloth underneath her skirt, but not as outerwear. However, in many tribes young girls did wear breechcloths like the boys until they became old enough for skirts and dresses. Among the Mohave people of the American Southwest, a breechcloth given to a young female symbolically recognizes her status as hwame.

Philippines

In the Philippines, loincloths of any sort are generally called bahág. It is often a single, long, rectangular cloth that is not tied with a belt or string, and were made from either barkcloth or hand-woven textiles. The design of the weave is often unique to a specific tribe, while colors may denote the wearer’s social rank, such as plain white for commoners.

Throughout the pre-colonial period, the bahág was the normative dress for commoners and the servile class (the alipin caste). It survives today among some indigenous tribes of the Philippines, most notably the various Cordilleran peoples in the mountains of inland northern Luzon.

The bahág was also favoured by the pre-colonial noble (tumao) and warrior (timawa) classes of the Visayan people, as it showed off their elaborate, full-body tattoos (batok) that advertised combat prowess and other significant achievements.

One method of wrapping the bahág involves first pulling the long rectangular cloth (usually around ) in between the legs to cover the genitals, with a longer back flap. This back flap is then twisted across the right leg, then crossed at the waist in an anti-clockwise direction. It then goes under the front flap, then across the left leg. It is twisted back across the back loop, above the buttocks. The result is the two rectangular ends hanging in front of and behind the waist, with a loop around the legs resembling a belt.

The native Tagalog word for "rainbow", bahagharì, literally means "loincloth of the king".

Europe 
Some European men around  wore leather breechcloths, as can be seen from the clothing of Ötzi. Ancient Romans wore a type of loincloth known as a subligaculum.

The use of breechcloths took on common use by the Metis and Acadians and are mentioned as early as the 1650s. In the 1740s and 50s they were issued to the Canadien as part of their war uniform and in 1755 they even tried to issue them to soldiers from France.

"During their travels across Canada, the French [canadiens] dress as the Indians; they do not wear breeches" “Many nations imitate the French customs; yet I observed, on the contrary, that the French in Canada, in many respects, follow the customs of the Indians, with whom they converse everyday. They make use of the tobacco pipes, shoes, garters, and girdles of the Indians.” -Peter Kalm, 1749. "Those who go to war receive a capot, two cotton shirts, one breechclout, one pair of leggings, on blanket, one pair of souliers de boeuf, a wood-handled knife, a worm and a musket when they do not bring any. The breechclout is a piece of broadcloth draped between the thighs in the Native manner and with the two ends held by a belt. One wears it without breeches to walk more easily in the woods." – d’Aleyrac, 1755–60. “During the week the men went about in their homes dressed much like the Indians, namely, in stockings and shoes like theirs, with garters, and a girdle about the waist; otherwise the clothing was like that of other Frenchmen.” (Kalm, p. 558). "The French familiarized themselves with us, Studied our Tongue, and Manners, wore our Dress, Married our Daughters, and our Sons their Maids" (Pontiac, Ottawa leader, 2.2.50-57)

See also 

 Similar Indian clothes
 Kacchera
 Langot
 Related Indian clothes
 Clothing in India
 Dhoti
 Lungi
 Similar foreign clothes
 Breechcloth
 Fundoshi
 Loincloth
 Mawashi
 Perizoma
 Subligaculum
 Thong
 Perizoma (loincloth)
 Fundoshi
 Kaupinam
 Related foreign clothes
 Tallit katan
 Temple garment: religious undergarments worn by many Mormons

Notes

References

External links 

 The Loincloth of Borneo
Breechcloth on Wordnik, retrieved on 22.12.2009
Breechcloth by Rick Obermeyer (Dec. 1990), retrieved on 22.12.2009

Indian clothing
Maya clothing
Polynesian clothing
Skirts
Swimsuits
Undergarments